Corunca is a commune in Mureș County, Romania. It lies in the heart of Transylvania.

Component villages 
Corunca became an independent commune when the component villages split from Livezeni in 2004. The commune is composed of two villages:

History 

The area where the commune lies was inhabited even in ancient times. On the outskirts of the villages, remains were found from prehistoric and Roman times. The name of the present-day commune was first recorded in 1332 as Korunka. In the vicinity, there used to be two other villages, Sárvári was destroyed in the 16th century while Kisernye was devastated in 1661 by Ottoman Turkish troops.

The village was historically part of the Székely Land in Transylvania and belonged to Marosszék in the Middle Ages. In the mid-1780s as part of the Josephine administrative reform, Marosszék was integrated into Küküllő county, however, the szék-system was restored in 1790. After the suppression of the Hungarian Revolution in 1849, the village formed part of the Székelykál military sub-division of the Marosvásárhely division in the Udvarhely military district. Between 1861 and 1876, the former Marosszék was restored. As a result of the administrative reform in 1876, the village fell within Maros-Torda County in the Kingdom of Hungary. After the Treaty of Trianon of 1920, it became part of Romania and fell within Mureş-Turda County during the interwar period. In 1940, the second Vienna Award granted the Northern Transylvania to Hungary and the villages forming part again of Maros-Torda County were held by Hungary until 1944. After Soviet occupation, the Romanian administration returned and the village became officially part of Romania in 1947. Between 1952 and 1960, the commune fell within the Magyar Autonomous Region, between 1960 and 1968 the Mureș-Magyar Autonomous Region forming a commune like in the present day. In 1968, the province was abolished, and since then, the area fell in Mureș County while the villages were comprised by Livezeni wherefrom they split in 2004 to form an independent commune.

Demographics

In 1910, the two current component villages were inhabited by  Hungarians (82.87%),  Romanians (8.86%) and 91 Roma (7.83%). In 1930, the census indicated  Hungarians (85.75%),  Romanians (12.70%) and 17 Roma (1.32%). In 2011, the population was composed as follows: 66.5% Hungarians, 30% Romanians and 3.2% Roma.

See also 
 List of Hungarian exonyms (Mureș County)

References

Communes in Mureș County
Localities in Transylvania
Székely communities